Litespeed F3 was a Norfolk, UK based F3 team from 2008 to 2012 founded by Steve Kenchington and Navdip "Nino" Singh Judge.

The car
Litespeed were developing an F3 car originally manufactured, in 2005, by the ATR Group in Italy as the SLC R1.

In 2006, the SLC R1 underwent a full aero upgrade, which produced good results particularly on high-speed tracks such as Nürburgring in Germany, where it attained pole position. By having autonomy on suspension geometry and layout, the Litespeed R1 also claims a slow-speed cornering advantage due to its set-up capabilities.

In 2007, the car did not race and the car and design/copyright was acquired by Litespeed F3 owners Nino Singh Judge and Steve Kenchington. The car was converted from an Opel to Honda engine over the winter and early part of 2008.

It made its race debut at Snetterton in Norfolk in June 2008 and despite no testing was pretty much on the pace driven by Callum MacLeod but suffered expected teething problems. On only its second outing at Brands Hatch in Kent the car finished 2nd driven by Jonathan Legris. This was the breakthrough the Litespeed F3 team were looking for and now hope for a win by the end of 2008 and for a Championship victory in 2009.

F1 entry
Litespeed announced its intention to enter Formula One under the  season's budget cap regulations. The team employed MGI Ltd., a company owned by former F1 designer Mike Gascoyne, in order to achieve this goal. When the budget cap was abolished the Malaysian backed team Lotus Racing negotiated with Litespeed to obtain their entry and enter under the Lotus Racing team name, who confirmed the continuing involvement of Mike Gascoyne.

References

External links

British auto racing teams
British Formula Three teams
Auto racing teams established in 2005
Auto racing teams disestablished in 2012